The Grammy Award for Best Engineered Album, Non-Classical has been awarded since 1959. The award had several minor name changes:
 In 1959, the award was known as Best Engineered Record – Non-Classical
 In 1960, it was awarded as Best Engineering Contribution – Other Than Classical or Novelty
 From 1961 to 1962, it was awarded as Best Engineering Contribution – Popular Recording
 In 1963, it was awarded as Best Engineering Contribution – Other Than Novelty and Other Than Classical
 In 1964, it was awarded as Best Engineered Recording – Other Than Classical 
 From 1965 to 1991, it returned to the title Best Engineered Recording – Non-Classical
 Since 1992, it has been awarded as Best Engineered Album, Non-Classical

This award is presented alongside the Grammy Award for Best Engineered Album, Classical. From 1960 to 1965 a further award was presented for Best Engineered Recording – Special or Novel Effects.

Years reflect the year in which the Grammy Awards were presented, for works released in the previous year. The award is presented to the audio engineer(s) (and, since 2012, also to the mastering engineer[s]) on the winning work, not to the artist or performer, except if the artist is also a credited engineer.

Winners and nominees

1950s

1960s

1970s

1980s

1990s

2000s

2010s

2020s

Summary

References

Engineered Album Non-Classical
Audio engineering
 
Album awards